The Stillwater River is an  side channel of the Penobscot River in Maine. The stream rejoins the main stem of the Penobscot in Orono.

The University of Maine campus, including the Fay Hyland Botanical Plantation, overlooks the Stillwater River near its confluence with the Penobscot River.

See also
List of rivers of Maine

References

Maine Streamflow Data from the USGS
Maine Watershed Data From Environmental Protection Agency

Tributaries of the Penobscot River
Rivers of Penobscot County, Maine
Old Town, Maine
Orono, Maine
Rivers of Maine